The Essex Police, Fire and Crime Commissioner is the police and crime commissioner, an elected official tasked with setting out the way crime is tackled by Essex Police in the English County of Essex. The post was created in November 2012, following an election held on 15 November 2012, and replaced the Essex Police Authority. The incumbent is Roger Hirst, who represents the Conservative Party.

List of Essex police and crime commissioners

There has so far been two elections in which the results were as follows.

References

Police and crime commissioners in England